Gone Girl is a 2014 psychological thriller film directed by David Fincher, and produced by Leslie Dixon, Bruna Papandrea, Arnon Milchan, Reese Witherspoon, Ceán Chaffin, and Joshua Donen. The screenplay was adapted by Gillian Flynn from her eponymous 2012 novel. Set in Missouri, United States, the film stars Ben Affleck as Nick Dunne, a writer who becomes the prime suspect in the mysterious disappearance of his wife Amy, played by Rosamund Pike. Neil Patrick Harris and Tyler Perry feature in supporting roles. The score was composed by Trent Reznor and Atticus Ross.

Gone Girl premiered at the New York Film Festival on September 26, 2014, before 20th Century Fox gave the film a wide release at over 3,000 theaters in the United States and Canada on October 3. It grossed over $368 million on a production budget of $61 million. As of November 2017, Gone Girl is Fincher's highest-grossing film. Rotten Tomatoes, a review aggregator, surveyed 348 reviews and judged 87% to be positive.

Gone Girl garnered awards and nominations in a variety of categories with particular praise for its direction, Pike's lead acting performance, Flynn's screenplay, and its score. At the 87th Academy Awards, Pike received a nomination for Best Actress. The film received four nominations at the 72nd Golden Globe Awards: Best Director for Fincher, Best Actress in a Drama for Pike, Best Screenplay for Flynn, and Best Original Score. Pike won the Empire Award for Best Actress, and garnered nominations in the same category at the 21st Screen Actors Guild Awards and 68th British Academy Film Awards (BAFTAs). She also received the Breakthrough Performance Award from the Palm Springs International Film Festival. Flynn was nominated at the BAFTAs, as well as the Writers Guild of America Awards. The National Board of Review included the film in their list of top ten films of the year.

Accolades

See also

 2014 in film

References

External links
 

Lists of accolades by film
Horror film lists